Clarice Lispector (born Chaya Pinkhasivna Lispector; December 10, 1920December 9, 1977) was a Ukrainian-born Brazilian novelist and short story writer. Her innovative, idiosyncratic works explore a variety of narrative styles with themes of intimacy and introspection, and have subsequently been internationally acclaimed. Born to a Jewish family in Podolia in Western Ukraine, as an infant she moved to Brazil with her family, amidst the disasters engulfing her native land following the First World War.

She grew up in Recife, the capital of the northeastern state of Pernambuco, where her mother died when she was nine. The family moved to Rio de Janeiro when she was in her teens. While in law school in Rio, she began publishing her first journalistic work and short stories, catapulting to fame at the age of 23 with the publication of her first novel, Near to the Wild Heart (Perto do Coração Selvagem), written as an interior monologue in a style and language that was considered revolutionary in Brazil.

She left Brazil in 1944 following her marriage to a Brazilian diplomat, and spent the next decade and a half in Europe and the United States. After returning to Rio de Janeiro in 1959, she published the stories of Family Ties (Laços de Família) and the novel The Passion According to G.H. (A Paixão Segundo G.H.). Injured in an accident in 1966, she spent the last decade of her life in frequent pain, steadily writing and publishing novels and stories, including Água Viva, until her premature death in 1977.

She has been the subject of numerous books, and references to her and her work are common in Brazilian literature and music. Several of her works have been turned into films. In 2009, the American writer Benjamin Moser published Why This World: A Biography of Clarice Lispector. Since that publication, her works have been the object of an extensive project of retranslation, published by New Directions Publishing and Penguin Modern Classics, the first Brazilian to enter that prestigious series. Moser, who is also the editor of her anthology The Complete Stories (2015), describes Lispector as the most important Jewish writer in the world since Kafka.

Early life, emigration and Recife
Clarice Lispector was born Chaya Lispector in Chechelnyk, Podolia, a shtetl in what is today Ukraine. She was the youngest of three daughters of Pinkhas Lispector and Mania Krimgold Lispector. Her family suffered terribly in the pogroms during the Russian Civil War that followed the dissolution of the Russian Empire, circumstances later dramatized in her older sister Elisa Lispector's autobiographical novel No exílio (In Exile, 1948). They eventually managed to flee to Romania, from where they emigrated to Brazil, where her mother Mania had relatives. They sailed from Hamburg and arrived in Brazil in the early months of 1922, when Chaya (Clarice) was little more than one year old.

The Lispectors changed their names upon arrival. Pinkhas became Pedro; Mania became Marieta; Leah became Elisa, and Chaya became Clarice. Only the middle daughter, Tania (April 19, 1915 – November 15, 2007), kept her name. They first settled in the northeastern city of Maceió, Alagoas. After three years, during which Marieta's health deteriorated rapidly, they moved to the city of Recife, Pernambuco, settling in the neighbourhood of Boa Vista, where they lived at number 367 in the Praça Maciel Pinheiro and later in the Rua da Imperatriz.

In Recife, where her father continued to struggle economically, her mother – who was paralysed (although some speculate she had been raped in the Ukraine pogroms, there is no confirmation on this by relatives and close friends ) – finally died on September 21, 1930, aged 42, when Clarice was nine. Clarice attended the Colégio Hebreo-Idisch-Brasileiro, which taught Hebrew and Yiddish in addition to the usual subjects. In 1932, she gained admission to the Ginásio Pernambucano, then the most prestigious secondary school in the state. A year later, strongly influenced by Hermann Hesse's Steppenwolf, she "consciously claimed the desire to write".

In 1935, Pedro Lispector decided to move with his daughters to the then-capital, Rio de Janeiro, where he hoped to find more economic opportunity and also to find Jewish husbands for his daughters. The family lived in the neighborhood of São Cristóvão, north of downtown Rio, before moving to Tijuca. In 1937, she entered the Law School of the University of Brazil, then one of the most prestigious institutions of higher learning in the country.  Her first known story, "Triunfo", was published in the magazine Pan on May 25, 1940. Soon afterwards, on August 26, 1940, as a result of a botched gallbladder operation, her beloved father died, aged 55.

While still in law school, Clarice began working as a journalist, first at the official government press service the Agência Nacional and then at the important newspaper A Noite. Lispector would come into contact with the younger generation of Brazilian writers, including Lúcio Cardoso, with whom she fell in love. Cardoso was gay, however, and she soon began seeing a law school colleague named Maury Gurgel Valente, who had entered the Brazilian Foreign Service, known as Itamaraty. In order to marry a diplomat, she had to be naturalized, which she did as soon as she came of age. On January 12, 1943, she was granted Brazilian citizenship. Eleven days later she married Gurgel.

Near to the Wild Heart

In December 1943, she published her first novel, Perto do coração selvagem (Near to the Wild Heart). The novel, which tells of the inner life of a young woman named Joana, caused a sensation. In October 1944, the book won the prestigious Graça Aranha Prize for the best debut novel of 1943. One critic, the poet Lêdo Ivo, called it "the greatest novel a woman has ever written in the Portuguese language." Another wrote that Clarice had "shifted the center of gravity around which the Brazilian novel had been revolving for about twenty years". "Clarice Lispector's work appears in our literary world as the most serious attempt at the introspective novel," wrote the São Paulo critic Sérgio Milliet. "For the first time, a Brazilian author goes beyond simple approximation in this almost virgin field of our literature; for the first time, an author penetrates the depths of the psychological complexity of the modern soul."

This novel, like all of her subsequent works, was marked by an intense focus on interior emotional states. When the novel was published, many claimed that her stream-of-consciousness writing style was heavily influenced by Virginia Woolf or James Joyce, but she only read these authors after the book was ready. The epigraph from Joyce and the title, which is taken from Joyce's A Portrait of the Artist as a Young Man, were both suggested by Lúcio Cardoso.

Shortly afterwards, Clarice and Maury Gurgel left Rio for the northern city of Belém, in the state of Pará, at the mouth of the Amazon. There, Maury served as a liaison between the Foreign Ministry and the international visitors who were using northern Brazil as a military base in World War II.

Europe and the United States
On July 29, 1944, Clarice left Brazil for the first time since she had arrived as a child, destined for Naples, where Maury was posted to the Brazilian Consulate. Naples was the staging post for the Brazilian troops of the Brazilian Expeditionary Force whose soldiers were fighting on the Allied side against the Nazis. She worked at the military hospital in Naples taking care of wounded Brazilian troops In Rome, she met the Italian poet Giuseppe Ungaretti, who translated parts of Near to the Wild Heart, and had her portrait painted by Giorgio de Chirico. In Naples she completed her second novel, O Lustre (The Chandelier, 1946), which like the first focused on the interior life of a girl, this time one named Virgínia. This longer and more difficult book also met with an enthusiastic critical reception, though its impact was less sensational than Near to the Wild Heart. "Possessed of an enormous talent and a rare personality, she will have to suffer, fatally, the disadvantages of both, since she so amply enjoys their benefits", wrote . After a short visit to Brazil in 1946, Clarice and Maury returned to Europe in April 1946, where Maury was posted to the embassy in Bern, Switzerland. This was a time of considerable boredom and frustration for Lispector, who was often depressed. "This Switzerland," she wrote her sister Tania, "is a cemetery of sensations." Her son Pedro Gurgel Valente was born in Bern on September 10, 1948, and in the city she wrote her third novel, A cidade sitiada (The Besieged City, 1946).

The book Lispector wrote in Bern, The Besieged City, tells the story of Lucrécia Neves, and the growth of her town, São Geraldo, from a little settlement to a large city. The book, which is full of metaphors of vision and seeing, met with a tepid reception and was "perhaps the least loved of Clarice Lispector's novels", according to a close friend of Lispector's. Sérgio Milliet concluded that "the author succumbs beneath the weight of her own richness." And the Portuguese critic João Gaspar Simões wrote: "Its hermeticism has the texture of the hermeticism of dreams. May someone find the key."

After leaving Switzerland in 1949 and spending almost a year in Rio, Clarice and Maury Gurgel Valente traveled to Torquay, Devon, where Maury was a delegate to the General Agreement on Tariffs and Trade (GATT). They remained in England from September 1950 until March 1951. Lispector liked England, though she suffered a miscarriage on a visit to London.

In 1952, back in Rio, where the family would stay about a year, Lispector published a short volume of six stories called Alguns contos (Some Stories) in a small edition sponsored by the Ministry of Education and Health. These stories formed the core of the later Laços de família (Family Ties), 1961. She also worked under the pseudonym Teresa Quadros as a women's columnist at the short-lived newspaper Comício.

In September 1952, the family moved to Washington, D.C., where they would live until June 1959. They bought a house at 4421 Ridge Street in the suburb of Chevy Chase, Maryland. On February 10, 1953, her second son Paulo was born. She grew close to the Brazilian writer Érico Veríssimo, then working for the Organization of American States, and his wife Mafalda, as well as to the wife of the ambassador, daughter of the former Brazilian dictator Getúlio Vargas. She also began publishing her stories in the new magazine Senhor, back in Rio. But she was increasingly discontented with the diplomatic milieu. "I hated it, but I did what I had to […] I gave dinner parties, I did everything you're supposed to do, but with a disgust…" She increasingly missed her sisters and Brazil, and in June 1959, she left her husband and returned with her sons to Rio de Janeiro, where she would spend the rest of her life.

Final years

Family Ties

In Brazil, Lispector struggled financially and tried to find a publisher for the novel she had completed in Washington several years before, as well as for her book of stories, Laços de família (Family Ties) This book incorporated the six stories of Some Stories along with seven new stories, some of which had been published in Senhor. It was published in 1960. The book, her friend Fernando Sabino wrote her, was "exactly, sincerely, indisputably, and even humbly, the best book of stories ever published in Brazil." And Érico Veríssimo said: "I haven't written about your book of stories out of sheer embarrassment to tell you what I think of it. Here goes: the most important story collection published in this country since Machado de Assis", Brazil's classic novelist.

The Apple in the Dark
A Maçã no escuro (The Apple in the Dark), which she had begun in Torquay, had been ready since 1956 but was repeatedly rejected by publishers, to Lispector's despair. Driven by interior dialogue rather than by plot, its purported subject is a man called Martim, who believes he has killed his wife and flees deep into the Brazilian interior, where he finds work as a farm laborer. The real concerns of the highly allegorical novel are language and creation. In 1962, the work was awarded the Carmen Dolores Barbosa Prize for the best novel of the previous year. Around this time she began a relationship with the poet Paulo Mendes Campos, an old friend. Mendes Campos was married and the relationship did not endure.

The Passion According to G.H. and The Foreign Legion

In 1964, she published one of her most shocking and famous books, A paixão segundo G.H., about a woman who, in the maid's room of her comfortable Rio penthouse, endures a mystical experience that leads to her eating part of a cockroach. In the same year, she published another book of stories and miscellany, The Foreign Legion.

The American translator Gregory Rabassa, who first encountered Lispector in the mid-1960s, at a conference on Brazilian literature, in Texas, recalled being "flabbergasted to meet that rare person [Lispector] who looked like Marlene Dietrich and wrote like Virginia Woolf".

On September 14, 1966, she suffered a terrible accident in her apartment. After taking a sleeping pill, she fell asleep in her bed with a lit cigarette. She was badly injured and her right hand almost had to be amputated. 

The next year, she published her first children's book, O Mistério do coelho pensante (The Mystery of the Thinking Rabbit, 1967), a translation of a book she had written in Washington, in English, for her son Paulo. In August 1967, she began writing a weekly column ("crônica") for the Jornal do Brasil, an important Rio newspaper, which greatly expanded her fame beyond the intellectual and artistic circles that had long admired her. These pieces were later collected in the posthumous work A Descoberta do mundo (The Discovery of the World, 1984).

The Woman Who Killed the Fish and An Apprenticeship or The Book of Pleasures
In 1968, Lispector participated in the political demonstrations against Brazil's hardening military dictatorship, and also published two books: her second work for children, A Mulher que matou os peixes (The Woman Who Killed the Fish), in which the narrator, Clarice, confesses to having forgotten to feed her son's fish, and An Apprenticeship or The Book of Pleasures.

Her first novel since G.H., Uma Aprendizagem ou O Livro dos Prazeres was a love story between a primary teacher, Lóri, and a philosophy teacher, Ulisses. The book drew on her writings in her newspaper columns, as she conducted interviews for the glossy magazine Manchete. The book received a new translation in April 2021 by New Directions. Cleveland Review of Books called it "a novel about the distance between people, but also the distances between the self and the self, the self and 'the God.'”

Covert Joy and Água viva (The Stream of Life) 

In 1971, Lispector published another book of stories, Felicidade clandestina (Covert Joy), several of which hearkened back to memories of her childhood in Recife. She began working on the book that many would consider her finest, Água Viva (The Stream of Life), though she struggled to complete it. Olga Borelli, a former nun who entered her life around this time and became her faithful assistant and friend, recalled:  When the book came out in 1973, it was instantly acclaimed as a masterpiece. "With this fiction," one critic wrote, "Clarice Lispector awakens the literature currently being produced in Brazil from a depressing and degrading lethargy and elevates it to a level of universal perennity and perfection." The book is an interior monologue with an unnamed first person narrator to an unnamed "you", and has been described as having a musical quality, with the frequent return of certain passages. Água viva was first translated into English in 1978 as The Stream of Life, with a new translation by Stefan Tobler published in 2012.

Where Were You at Night and The Via Crucis of the Body
In 1974, Lispector published two books of stories, Onde estivestes de noite (Where Were You at Night)—which focuses in part on the lives of aging women—and A via crucis do corpo (The Via Crucis of the Body). Though her previous books had often taken her years to complete, the latter was written in three days, after a challenge from her publisher, Álvaro Pacheco, to write three stories about themes relating to sex. Part of the reason she wrote so much may have had to do with her having been unexpectedly fired from the Jornal do Brasil at the end of 1973, which put her under increasing financial pressure. She began to paint and intensified her activity as a translator, publishing translations of Agatha Christie, Oscar Wilde, and Edgar Allan Poe.

In 1975 she was invited to the First World Congress of Sorcery in Bogotá, an event which garnered wide press coverage and increased her notoriety. At the conference, her story "The Egg and the Hen", first published in The Foreign Legion, was read in English.

A Breath of Life and The Hour of the Star

Lispector worked on a book called Um sopro de vida: pulsações (A Breath of Life: Pulsations) that would be published posthumously in the mid-1970s. The book consists of a dialogue between an "Author" and his creation, Angela Pralini, a character whose name was borrowed from a character in a story in Where Were You at Night. She used this fragmentary form for her final and perhaps most famous novel, A Hora da estrela (The Hour of the Star, 1977), piecing the story together, with the help of Olga Borelli, from notes scrawled on loose bits of paper. The Hour of the Star tells the story of Macabéa, one of the iconic characters in Brazilian literature, a starving, poor typist from Alagoas, the state where Lispector's family first arrived, lost in the metropolis of Rio de Janeiro. Macabéa's name refers to the Maccabees, and is one of the very few overtly Jewish references in Lispector's work. Its explicit focus on Brazilian poverty and marginality was also new.

Death
Shortly after The Hour of the Star was published, Lispector was admitted to the hospital. She had inoperable ovarian cancer, though she was not told the diagnosis. She died on the eve of her 57th birthday and was buried on December 11, 1977, at the Jewish Cemetery of Caju, Rio de Janeiro.

Awards and honors

2013 Best Translated Book Award, shortlist, A Breath of Life: Pulsations
2016 PEN Translation Prize, winner, The Complete Stories, trans. Katrina Dodson
In 2018 a Google Doodle was created to celebrate her 98th birthday.

Bibliography

Novels
 Near to the Wild Heart (1943) Translated by Alison Entrekin
 The Chandelier (1946) Translated by Benjamin Moser and Magdalena Edwards
 The Besieged City (1949) Translated by Johnny Lorenz
 The Apple in the Dark (1961) Translated by Gregory Rabassa
 The Passion According to G.H. (1964) Translated by Idra Novey
 An Apprenticeship or The Book of Pleasures (1968) Translated by Richard A. Mazzara and Lorri A. Parris (1986); translated by Stefan Tobler (2021)
 Água viva (1973) Translated in 1978 by Elizabeth Lowe and Earl Fitz as The Stream of Life; Translated in 2012 by Stefan Tobler retaining original title
 The Hour of the Star (1977) Translated in 1992 by Giovanni Pontiero and in 2011 by Benjamin Moser
 A Breath of Life (1978) Translated by Johnny Lorenz

Short story collections
 Alguns contos (1952) – Some Stories
 Laços de família (1960) – Family Ties. Includes works previously published in Alguns Contos.
 A legião estrangeira (1964) – The Foreign Legion
 Felicidade clandestina (1971) – Covert Joy
 A imitação da rosa (1973) – The Imitation of the Rose. Includes previously published material.
 A via crucis do corpo (1974) – The Via Crucis of the Body
 Onde estivestes de noite (1974) – Where You Were at Night
 Para não esquecer (1978) – Not to Forget
 A bela e a fera (1979) – Beauty and the Beast
 The Complete Stories (2015) – Translated by Katrina Dodson

Children's literature
 O Mistério do Coelho Pensante (1967) – The Mystery of the Thinking Rabbit
 A mulher que matou os peixes (1968) – The Woman Who Killed the Fish, trans. Benjamin Moser (New Directions, 2022)
 A Vida Íntima de Laura (1974) – Laura's Intimate Life
 Quase de verdade (1978) – Almost True
 Como nasceram as estrelas: Doze lendas brasileiras (1987) – How the Stars were Born: Twelve Brazilian Legends

Journalism and other shorter writings
 A Descoberta do Mundo (1984) – The Discovery of the World (named Selected Chronicas in the English version). Lispector's newspaper columns in the Jornal do Brasil.
 Visão do esplendor (1975) – Vision of Splendor
 De corpo inteiro (1975) – With the Whole Body. Lispector's interviews with famous personalities.
 Aprendendo a viver (2004) – Learning to Live. A selection of columns from The Discovery of the World.
 Outros escritos (2005) – Other Writings. Diverse texts including interviews and stories.
 Correio feminino (2006) – Ladies' Mail. Selection of Lispector's texts, written pseudonymously, for Brazilian women's pages.
 Entrevistas (2007) – Interviews
 Todas as Crónicas (2018). Too Much of Life: The Complete Crônicas, trans. Margaret Jull Costa and Robin Patterson (New Directions, 2022)

Correspondence
 Cartas perto do coração (2001) – Letters near the Heart. Letters exchanged with Fernando Sabino.
 Correspondências (2002) – Correspondence
 Minhas queridas (2007) – My dears. Letters exchanged with her sisters Elisa Lispector and Tania Lispector Kaufmann.

See also

 Brazilian literature
 Why This World: A Biography of Clarice Lispector
 Benjamin Moser

References

Further reading
 Benjamin Moser, Why This World: A Biography of Clarice Lispector, Oxford University Press (2009), 
 Braga-Pinto, César, "Clarice Lispector and the Latin American Bang," in Lucille Kerr and Alejandro Herrero-Olaizola (eds). New York: The Modern Language Association of America, 2015. pp. 147–161
 Earl E. Fitz, Sexuality and Being in the Poststructuralist Universe of Clarice Lispector: The Différance of Desire, University of Texas Press (2001), 
 Giffuni, C.  "Clarice Lispector: A Complete English Bibliography," Lyra, Vol. 1 No. 3 1988, pp. 26–31.
 Levilson Reis, "Clarice Lispector," in Cynthia M. Tompkins and David W. Foster (eds.), Notable Twentieth-Century Latin American Women (Westport, CT: Greenwood, 2001), pp. 165–69.
 Musch, S. and B. Willem, "Clarice Lispector on Jewishness after the Shoah. A Reading of Perdoando Deus," Partial Answers - A Journal of Literature and the History of Ideas, Vol. 16 No. 2 2018, pp. 225–238.

External links

Official site (in Portuguese)
The Brazilian Sphinx. By  Lorrie Moore. NY Review of Books, September 24, 2009 
An appreciation by Anderson Tepper in Nextbook
Clarice Lispector: An Influential and Original Brazilian Writer
Biographcal timeline in English, translated from the Portuguese, at Vidos Lusófonas
Interview with TV Cultura, Sao Paulo, Feb 1977 Portuguese with English subtitles.
Reviews of journalistic prose

20th-century Brazilian novelists
Brazilian journalists
Brazilian short story writers
Postmodern writers
Translators of Edgar Allan Poe
Translators of Agatha Christie
Translators of Oscar Wilde
20th-century journalists

20th-century Brazilian women writers
Brazilian women journalists
Brazilian women novelists
Brazilian women short story writers

1920 births
People from Vinnytsia Oblast
1977 deaths
Deaths from cancer in Rio de Janeiro (state)
Deaths from ovarian cancer

Jewish Brazilian writers
Jewish women writers
Soviet emigrants to Brazil
Brazilian people of Ukrainian-Jewish descent